Pickle meat also referred to as pickled pork is a Louisiana cuisine specialty often served with red beans and rice. Dan Baum offers a humorous take on a Northerner's introduction to pickle meat in a short story that was featured in The New Yorker in 2007.

See also

 List of pickled foods
 List of pork dishes

References

External links
 NPR Story: "Finding New Orleans Thanksgiving, In Maryland"

Louisiana cuisine
Pork dishes
Meat